Elias I served as Greek Patriarch of Alexandria between 963 and 1000 AD.

References

10th-century Patriarchs of Alexandria
Melkites in the Fatimid Caliphate